Faryab-e Masjid (also Romanized as Fāryāb-e Masjid) is a village in Hati Rural District, Hati District, Lali County, Khuzestan Province, Iran. At the 2006 census, its population was 389, in 59 families.

References 

Populated places in Lali County